Zolbetuximab (development code IMAB362) is an experimental monoclonal antibody against isoform 2 of Claudin-18. It is under investigation for the treatment of gastrointestinal adenocarcinomas and pancreatic tumors. IMAB362 was developed by Ganymed Pharmaceuticals AG. Astellas Pharmaceuticals acquired the rights to Zolbetuximab in December, 2016 when it acquired Ganymed Pharmaceuticals. 

The drug was in phase III clinical trials  for gastric cancer.

References 

Monoclonal antibodies
Experimental drugs